Picture to Post is a 1969 documentary film directed by Sarah Erulkar. The film explores the design process of postage stamps and the work of three notable designers, Arnold Machin, Jeffery Matthews and David Gentleman. It was awarded the BAFTA in 1970 for best short documentary film.

References 

1969 films
British documentary films
1960s English-language films
1960s British films